A glacial refugium (plural refugia) is a geographic region which made possible the survival of flora and fauna in times of ice ages and allowed for post-glacial re-colonization. Different types of glacial refugia can be distinguished, namely nunatak, peripheral and lowland refugia. Glacial refugia have been suggested as a major cause of the patterns of distributions of flora and fauna in both temperate and tropical latitudes. With respect to disjunct populations of modern-day species distributions, especially in birds, doubt has been cast on the validity of such inferences, as much of the differentiation between populations observed today may have occurred before or after their restriction to refugia. In contrast, isolated geographic locales that host one or more critically endangered species (regarded as paleoendemics or glacial relicts) are generally uncontested as bona fide glacial refugia.

Identification of glacial refugia 
Traditionally, the identification of glacial refugia have occurred through the assessment of palaeoecological evidence, to determine the origins of modern taxa.  For example, paleoecological approaches, which focus on the study of fossil organisms and their remains, have been used to reconstruct the distributions of pollen in Europe, for the 13,000 years since the last glaciation. Researchers in this case ultimately established the spread of forest trees from the mountainous southern fringe of Europe, which suggests that this area served as a glacial refugia during this time.

Different types of glacial refugia 
In studies exploring the extent of glacial refugia in mountain species, three distinct types of glacial refugia have been identified.

Nunatak glacial refugia 
A nunatak is a type of glacial refugia that is located on the snow-free, exposed peaks of mountains, which lie above the ice sheet during glaciations.  The identification of ‘diversity hotspots’ in areas, which should have been migration regions during major glacial episodes, is evidence for nunatak glacial refugia.  For example, the Monte Rosa mountain ranges, the Avers, and the Engadine and the  Bernina are all floristically rich proposed nunatak regions, which are indicative nunatak glacial survival.

Peripheral glacial refugia 
Peripheral glacial refugia still exists within the mountain system but contrary to nunataks, which exist on the peaks, this type of refugia is located along the borders of mountain systems.  Evidence for this type of mountain refugia can be found along the borders of the Carpathian Mountains, Pyrenees or  European Alps, all of which were formally glaciated mountain systems. For example, using the amplified fragment length polymorphism (AFLP) technique, researchers have been able to infer the survival of Phyteuma globulariifolium in peripheral refugia in the European Alps.

Lowland glacial refugia 

Lowland glacial refugia, unlike nunatak and peripheral glacial refugia, is a type of refugia that exists outside of the mountain system in the lowlands. Situated beyond the limits of ice shields, lowland refugia has been identified for a number of plant and animal species. In Europe, for example, through allozyme analysis, researchers have been able to confirm the continuous distribution of Zygaena exulans in between the foothills of the Pyrenees and the Alps during the last ice age.

In eastern North America, lowland glacial refuges along the Atlantic and Gulf Coasts host endemic plants — some of which are rare, even endangered, and others entail the most southerly disjunct populations of plants that commonly appear only hundreds of miles to the north. Major rivers draining southward from the Appalachian Mountains are associated with a gradation of paleoendemic tree species. These range from the extinct Critchfield spruce near the outlet of the Mississippi River, to extinct-in-the-wild Franklinia along the Altamaha River, to the critically endangered Florida torreya and Florida yew at the downstream end of the Chattahoochee River system. (See illustration at right.)

See also 
Drought refuge
Last Glacial Maximum refugia
Refugium (population biology)
Glacial survival hypothesis

References 

Biogeography
Geography
Ecology
Glaciers